Kittian and Nevisian Americans are Americans of Saint Kitts and Nevis ancestry, or Americans that were born in Saint Kitts and Nevis.

Notable people

Bertram L. Baker, former member of the New York State Assembly
Rupert Crosse, actor; first African American to be nominated for the Best Supporting Actor Academy Award
Louis Farrakhan, Nation of Islam leader
Alexander Hamilton, 1st United States Secretary of the Treasury
Constance Baker Motley, civil rights activist, judge, and politician
Diane Patrick, lawyer and former First Lady of Massachusetts
Tregenza Roach, Lieutenant Governor of the U.S. Virgin Islands
Neil Strauss, author of The Game: Penetrating the Secret Society of Pickup Artists
Susan L. Taylor, former editor-in-chief of Essence
Bill Thompson, New York City politician
Cicely Tyson, actress who was inducted into the Television Hall of Fame
John Gorrie, credited inventor of mechanical refrigeration

See also
Saint Kitts and Nevis–United States relations

References 

 
Saint Kitts and Nevis diaspora
Caribbean American